Great Livermere is a village and civil parish in the West Suffolk district of Suffolk in eastern England. It is located around four miles north-east of the borough's largest town Bury St Edmunds.
Great Livermere also has a village hall located six miles from Bury St Edmunds, where meetings and other functions are often held for the village. Great Livermere has a small population of 226, according to the 2011 census; there are 103 males and 123 females recorded. As seen from the population graph, the population of the village has fluctuated rapidly; from 1850 to 1950 the population decreased rapidly, however since the 1950s the population has steadily risen.

History 
The village’s name means Reed Lake being derived from the Old English words lēfer meaning rush, or reed and mere meaning pond, pool, or lake.
The village is first recorded before the Norman conquest in the S1051 charter of Edward the Confessor granting lands to Ely Abbey. 
The Domesday Book records the population of Great Livermere in 1086 to be 52 households along with 3 cattle, 3 pigs, and 100 sheep.

The grade I listed church of St Peter’s contains wall paintings, a three-decker pulpit, and one of the finest organs in the area along with the grave of William Sakings, Falconer to Kings Charles I, Charles II, and James II.

Historical writings
In 1870–72, John Marius Wilson's Imperial Gazetteer of England and Wales described the village as:

In 1887, John Bartholomew also wrote an entry on Great Livermere in the Gazetteer of the British Isles with a much shorter description:

In literature
The antiquarian and ghost story writer M. R. James was the son of the Rector of Great Livermere and from the age of three (1865) until 1909 James's home, if not always his residence, was at the Rectory in Great Livermere, inspiring the location for A Vignette, his last supernatural story.

Livermere Hall, a country house at Little Livermere which was demolished in 1923, is thought to have inspired the fictitious Castringham Hall in his ghost story "The Ash-tree", published in Ghost Stories of an Antiquary in 1904, and the surname of the ghostly protagonist, "Mothersole" appears on gravestones in the churchyard. The old rectory itself is now known as "Livermere Hall".

Statistics 
Religion within Great Livermere is predominantly Christian according to the office for National statistics, there are 135 Christians, 70 of which have no religion, while the remaining population are unaccounted for. According to other figures from Neighborhood statistics, within Great Livermere marital and civil partnership status demonstrate 49 people are single, 95 are married, 6 separated, 23 widowed and 17 divorced. In terms of health care within Great Livermere, 45.6% have very good health, 28.3% have good health, 19.9% have fair health, 4.4% bad health, leaving only 1.8% with very bad health. This demonstrates the majority of the population have very good health in comparison to a small fraction with very bad health, conveying a sense of a good health care sector.

Occupations of males and females 
As reported from the Vision of Britain census report in 1881, it is clear from the graph below that there is significant divide between occupations of males and females within Great Livermere. The graph demonstrates twice as many females than males within the domestic offices and services industry, in comparison to a ratio of 39:1 males in the agricultural industry. The agricultural sector is clearly marked on the graph seen below as the most predominant livelihood according to census data from the Vision of Britain report. In addition, it is only males that engage with animals e.g. game-keeping whereas females are accounted for no engagement.

According to the Vision of Britain census report the ratio of males to females in the furniture, housing and decorating sector is 5:0 also showing no accounts of females. Further more women are the only sex to engage in working with dress e.g.tailoring demonstrating the comparison between sexes at this time in terms of occupations. A clear divide is seen in patriarchal norms within Great Livermere and the roles carried out between sexes as demonstrated from the 1881 graph below. In recent years as seen from the Office for National statistics census reports from 2011 show the majority of industry is manufacturing alongside health and social care activities. This shows a shift from the dominated agricultural sector as reported from 1881 census reports to a more modern day industry such as production and retail trade, although as Great Livermere is a small countryside village farming still occurs as a way of life.

Economy 
All usual residents aged 16–74 account for 165 of the population of Great Livermere in 2011. Census data for 2011 states  
 62 are in full-time work  
 21 are in part-time work  
 31 are retired, the remaining population care for sick and disabled as well as some economically inactive.  
In terms of housing within the Village of Great Livermere it is evident from the Office for National Statistics 2011 census report that the most predominant type of housing are bungalows. Other statistics show 35 live in detached, 61 in semi detached, 100 living in bungalows, and the remaining are in either apartments or mobile homes. This shows the majority of Great Livermere village are small bungalow housing perhaps catering for a more elderly population.

Transport 
In terms of transport within Great Livermere, Suffolk it is evident from the Office for National statistics that cars and vans are the most common mode of transport. Census data from 2011 shows 82 people accounting for car and van use for travelling to work, in comparison to only 4 using a coach or bus. This clearly demonstrates poor public transport in the countryside area of Great Livermere as the majority work from home rather than commute outside of the town, leaving the remaining on foot and on bicycles.

Notable residents
M. R. James; English author known for ghost stories, medievalist scholar and provost of King's College, Cambridge (1905–18), and of Eton College (1918–36).
Thomas Clerke (MP); a Member (MP) of the Parliament of England for Wells in 1547.
William Buckenham; a 16th-century priest and academic.

References

External links

Villages in Suffolk
Civil parishes in Suffolk
Borough of St Edmundsbury
Thedwastre Hundred